Matrix completion is the task of filling in the missing entries of a partially observed matrix, which is equivalent to performing data imputation in statistics. A wide range of datasets are naturally organized in matrix form. One example is the movie-ratings matrix, as appears in the Netflix problem: Given a ratings matrix in which each entry  represents the rating of movie  by customer , if customer  has watched movie   and is otherwise missing, we would like to predict the remaining entries in order to make good recommendations to customers on what to watch next. Another example is the document-term matrix: The frequencies of words used in a collection of documents can be represented as a matrix, where each entry corresponds to the number of times the associated term appears in the indicated document.

Without any restrictions on the number of degrees of freedom in the completed matrix this problem is underdetermined since the hidden entries could be assigned arbitrary values. Thus we require some assumption on the matrix to create a well-posed problem, such as assuming it has maximal determinant, is positive definite, or is low-rank.

For example, one may assume the matrix has low-rank structure, and then seek to find the lowest rank matrix or, if the rank of the completed matrix is known, a matrix of rank  that matches the known entries. The illustration shows that a partially revealed rank-1 matrix (on the left) can be completed with zero-error (on the right) since all the rows with missing entries should be the same as the third row. In the case of the Netflix problem the ratings matrix is expected to be low-rank since user preferences can often be described by a few factors, such as the movie genre and time of release.  Other applications include computer vision, where missing pixels in images need to be reconstructed, detecting the global positioning of sensors in a network from partial distance information, and multiclass learning. The matrix completion problem is in general NP-hard, but under additional assumptions there are efficient algorithms that achieve exact reconstruction with high probability.

In statistical learning point of view, the matrix completion problem is an application of matrix regularization which is a generalization of vector regularization. For example, in the low-rank matrix completion problem one may apply the regularization penalty taking the form of a nuclear norm

Low rank matrix completion 
One of the variants of the matrix completion problem is to find the lowest rank matrix  which matches the matrix , which we wish to recover, for all entries in the set  of observed entries. The mathematical formulation of this problem is as follows:

Candès and Recht proved that with assumptions on the sampling of the observed entries and sufficiently many sampled entries this problem has a unique solution with high probability.

An equivalent formulation, given that the matrix  to be recovered is known to be of rank , is to solve for  where

Assumptions 
A number of assumptions on the sampling of the observed entries and the number of sampled entries are frequently made to simplify the analysis and to ensure the problem is not underdetermined.

Uniform sampling of observed entries 
To make the analysis tractable, it is often assumed that the set  of observed entries and fixed cardinality is sampled uniformly at random from the collection of all subsets of entries of cardinality . To further simplify the analysis, it is instead assumed that  is constructed by Bernoulli sampling, i.e. that each entry is observed with probability . Another simplification is to assume that entries are sampled independently and with replacement.

Lower bound on number of observed entries 
There is an information theoretic lower bound on how many entries must be observed before  can be uniquely reconstructed.
Using this result,
one can show that at least

entries must be observed for matrix completion in

to have a unique solution 
when

.

If we assume Bernoulli sampling of the set of observed entries, the Coupon collector effect implies that entries on the order of  must be observed to ensure that there is an observation from each row and column with high probability.

Incoherence 
The concept of incoherence arose in compressed sensing. Almost all the entries of  must be sampled before it can be reconstructed.

 
 The entries of  have magnitudes upper bounded by 

Low rank matrix completion with noise 
In real world application, one often observe only a few entries corrupted at least by a small amount of noise. For example, in the Netflix problem, the ratings are uncertain. Candès and Plan  showed that it is possible to fill in the many missing entries of large low-rank matrices from just a few noisy samples by nuclear norm minimization. The noisy model assumes that we observe

where  is a noise term. Note that the noise can be either stochastic or deterministic. Alternatively the model can be expressed as

where  is an  matrix with entries  for  assuming that  for some  .To recover the incomplete matrix, we try to solve the following optimization problem:

Among all matrices consistent with the data, find the one with minimum nuclear norm. Candès and Plan  have shown that this reconstruction is accurate. They have proved that when perfect noiseless recovery occurs, then matrix completion is stable vis a vis perturbations. The error is proportional to the noise level . Therefore, when the noise level is small, the error is small. Here the matrix completion problem does not obey the restricted isometry property (RIP). For matrices, the RIP would assume that the sampling operator obeys

for all matrices  with sufficiently small rank and  sufficiently small.
The methods are also applicable to sparse signal recovery problems in which the RIP does not hold.

High rank matrix completion 
The high rank matrix completion in general is NP-Hard. However, with certain assumptions, some incomplete high rank matrix or even full rank matrix can be completed.

Eriksson, Balzano and Nowak  have considered the problem of completing a matrix with the assumption that the columns of the matrix belong to a union of multiple low-rank subspaces. Since the columns belong to a union of subspaces, the problem may be viewed as a missing-data version of the subspace clustering problem.

The algorithm involves several steps: (1) local neighborhoods; (2) local subspaces; (3) subspace refinement; (4) full matrix completion. This method can be applied to Internet distance matrix completion and topology identification.

Algorithms for Low-Rank Matrix Completion 
Various matrix completion algorithms have been proposed. These includes convex relaxation-based algorithm, gradient-based algorithm, and alternating minimization-based algorithm.

Convex relaxation 
The rank minimization problem is NP-hard. This is analogous to minimizing the L1-norm rather than the L0-norm for vectors. The convex relaxation can be solved using semidefinite programming (SDP) by noticing that the optimization problem is equivalent to

State of the art solvers like SDPT3 can only handle matrices of size up to 100 by 100   An alternative first order method that approximately solves the convex relaxation is the Singular Value Thresholding Algorithm introduced by Cai, Candès and Shen.

This result has been improved by Candès and Tao.  They achieve bounds that differ from the optimal bounds only by polylogarithmic factors by strengthening the assumptions.  Instead of the incoherence property, they assume the strong incoherence property with parameter .  This property states that:

Intuitively, strong incoherence of a matrix  asserts that the orthogonal projections of standard basis vectors to  has magnitudes that have high likelihood if the singular vectors were distributed randomly.

For arbitrary , the number of observed entries sufficient for this assertion hold true is on the order of 

Another convex relaxation approach  is to minimize the Frobenius squared norm under a rank constraint. This is equivalent to solving

By introducing an orthogonal projection matrix  (meaning ) to model the rank of  via  and taking this problem's convex relaxation, we obtain the following semidefinite program

If Y is a projection matrix (i.e., has binary eigenvalues) in this relaxation, then the relaxation is tight. Otherwise, it gives a valid lower bound on the overall objective. Moreover, it can be converted into a feasible solution with a (slightly) larger objective by rounding the eigenvalues of Y greedily. Remarkably, this convex relaxation can be solved by alternating minimization on X and Y without solving any SDPs, and thus it scales beyond the typical numerical limits of state-of-the-art SDP solvers like SDPT3 or Mosek.

This approach is a special case of a more general reformulation technique, which can be applied to obtain a valid lower bound on any low-rank problem with a trace-matrix-convex objective.

Gradient descent 
Let  be a matrix that matches  on the set  of observed entries and is 0 elsewhere. They then propose the following algorithm:
 Project  onto its first  principal components.  Call the resulting matrix .
 Solve  where  is some regularization function by gradient descent with line search. Initialize  at  where .
 Return the matrix .

Steps 1 and 2 of the algorithm yield a matrix  very close to the true matrix  (as measured by the root mean square error (RMSE)) with high probability.  In particular, with probability ,  for some constant .   denotes the Frobenius norm.  Note that the full suite of assumptions is not needed for this result to hold.  The incoherence condition, for example, only comes into play in exact reconstruction.  Finally, although trimming may seem counter intuitive as it involves throwing out information, it ensures projecting  onto its first  principal components gives more information about the underlying matrix  than about the observed entries.

Then gradient descent can be performed over the cross product of two Grassman manifolds.

Alternating least squares minimization 
Alternating minimization represents a widely applicable and empirically successful approach for finding low-rank matrices that best fit the given data. For example, for the problem of low-rank matrix completion, this method is believed to be one of the most accurate and efficient, and formed a major component of the winning entry in the Netflix problem. In the alternating minimization approach, the low-rank target matrix is written in a bilinear form:

;

the algorithm then alternates between finding the best  and the best . While the overall problem is non-convex, each sub-problem is typically convex and can be solved efficiently. Jain, Netrapalli and Sanghavi  have given one of the first guarantees for performance of alternating minimization for both matrix completion and matrix sensing.

The alternating minimization algorithm can be viewed as an approximate way to solve the following non-convex problem:

The AltMinComplete Algorithm proposed by Jain, Netrapalli and Sanghavi is listed here:
 Input: observed set , values 
  i.e., top- left singular vectors of 
 for  do
     
     
 end for
 Return 

They showed that by observing  random entries of an incoherent matrix , AltMinComplete algorithm can recover  in  steps. In terms of sample complexity, theoretically, Alternating Minimization may require a bigger  than Convex Relaxation. However empirically it seems not the case which implies that the sample complexity bounds can be further tightened. In terms of time complexity, they showed that AltMinComplete needs time
 
.

It is worth noting that, although convex relaxation based methods have rigorous analysis, alternating minimization based algorithms are more successful in practice.

Applications 
Several applications of matrix completion are summarized by Candès and Plan as follows:

Collaborative filtering
Collaborative filtering is the task of making automatic predictions about the interests of a user by collecting taste information from many users. Companies like Apple, Amazon, Barnes and Noble, and Netflix are trying to predict their user preferences from partial knowledge. In these kind of matrix completion problem, the unknown full matrix is often considered low rank because only a few factors typically contribute to an individual's tastes or preference.

System identification
In control, one would like to fit a discrete-time linear time-invariant state-space model

to a sequence of inputs  and outputs . From the input/output pair, one would like to recover the matrices  and the initial state . This problem can also be viewed as a low-rank matrix completion problem.

Internet of things (IoT) localization
The localization (or global positioning) problem emerges naturally in IoT sensor networks. The problem is to recover the sensor map in Euclidean space from a local or partial set of pairwise distances. Thus it is a matrix completion problem with rank two if the sensors are located in a 2-D plane and three if they are in a 3-D space.

Social Networks Recovery
Most of the real-world social networks have low-rank distance matrices. When we are not able to measure the complete network, which can be due to reasons such as private nodes, limited storage or compute resources, we only have a fraction of distance entries known. Criminal networks are a good example of such networks. Low-rank Matrix Completion can be used to recover these unobserved distances.

See also

Matrix regularization
Netflix Prize
Collaborative filtering
System identification
Convex optimization
Imputation

References 

Matrix theory